Haymanot is the branch of Judaism which is practiced by the Beta Israel, also known as Ethiopian Jews.

In Geʽez, Tigrinya and Amharic, Haymanot means 'religion' or 'faith.' Thus in modern Amharic and Tigrinya, it is common to speak of the Christian haymanot, the Jewish haymanot or the Muslim haymanot. In Israel, the term is only associated with a particular religion (Judaism).

Religious leaders

Nabiyy (Prophet), related to the Arabic and Hebrew words nabī and nevi, used in Jewish and Islamic writing to refer to prophets.
Monkosa (Monk), related to the Greek word monakhós, which means "alone, solitary."
Kahen or Kes (Priest), spiritual leader, similar to a Kohen and analogous to a Rabbi or Hakham.
Liqa Kahnet, (High Priest)
Debtera, itinerant holy man
Shmagle, elder

Texts

Mäṣḥafä Kedus (Holy Scriptures) is the name for the religious literature. The language of the writings is Geʽez. The Beta Israel lack a firm distinction between "canonical" and "non-canonical" religious texts. The religious texts of the Beta Israel include:
The Orit (from Aramaic "Oraita" – "Torah"), which consists of the Five Books of Moses (Genesis, Exodus, Leviticus, Numbers, Deuteronomy) and the books of Joshua, Judges and Ruth.
The Five Books of Solomon: Mesályata Salomon (Proverbs 1–24), Tagsásá Salomon (Proverbs 25–31), Ecclesiastes, Wisdom of Solomon, and Song of Songs.
Other biblical and apocryphal books include: the Books of Samuel, the Books of Kings, The Minor Prophets, Psalms, Isaiah, Jeremiah, Ezekiel, Daniel, Job, Sirach, Esther, Judith, Tobit, the Books of Chronicles, Ezra-Nehemiah, 1 Esdras, 2 Esdras, the Books of Meqabyan, Jubilees, and Enoch.
Unique non-biblical writings include: The Testaments of Abraham, Isaac, Jacob, Moses, and Aaron, Nagara Muse (The Conversation of Moses), Te'ezaza Sanbat (Commandments of the Sabbath), Arde'et (Disciples), Gorgorious, Barok (Apocalypse of Baruch) Mäṣḥafä Sa'atat (Book of Hours), fālasfā (Philosophers), Abba Eliyas (Father Elijah), Mäṣḥafä Mäla'əkt (Book of the Angels), Dərsanä Abrəham Wäsara Bägabs (Homily on Abraham and Sarah in Egypt), Gadla Sosna (The Story of Susanna) and Baqadāmi Gabra Egzi'abḥēr (In the Beginning God Created).

In contrast to mainstream Rabbinite Jews, adherents of Haymanot Judaism do not believe in Oral Law, nor in the codified Talmud.

Prayer house

The synagogue is called masgid (place of worship) also  (Holy house) or ṣalot bet (Prayer house).

Dietary laws

Dietary laws are based mainly on Leviticus, Deuteronomy and Jubilees. Permitted and forbidden animals and their signs appear on Leviticus 11:3–8 and Deuteronomy 14:4–8. Forbidden birds are listed on Leviticus 11:13–23 and Deuteronomy 14:12–20. Signs of permitted fish are written on Leviticus 11:9–12 and Deuteronomy 14:9–10. Insects and larvae are forbidden according to Leviticus 11:41–42. Birds of prey are forbidden according to Leviticus 11:13–19. Gid hanasheh is forbidden per Genesis 32:33. Mixtures of milk and meat are not prepared or eaten but are not banned either: Haymanot interpreted the verses Exodus 23:19, Exodus 34:26 and Deuteronomy 14:21 literally "shalt not seethe a kid in its mother's milk" (like the Karaites). Nowadays, under Rabbinic influence, mixing dairy products with meat is banned.

Ethiopian Jews were forbidden to eat the food of non-Jews. A Kes eats only meat he has slaughtered himself, which his hosts then prepare both for him and themselves. Beta Israel who broke these taboos were ostracized and had to undergo a purification process. Purification included fasting for one or more days, eating only uncooked chickpeas provided by the Kes, and ritual purification before entering the village. Unlike other Ethiopians, the Beta Israel do not eat raw meat dishes like kitfo or gored gored.

Calendar and holidays
The Beta Israel calendar is a lunar calendar of 12 months, each 29 or 30 days alternately. Every four years there has been a leap year which added a full month (30 days). The calendar is a combination of the ancient calendar of Alexandria Jewry, Book of Jubilees, Book of Enoch, Abu Shaker and the Geʽez calendar. The years are counted according to the Counting of Kushta "1571 to Jesus Christ, 7071 to the Gyptians and 6642 to the Hebrews", according to this counting the year 5782 in the Rabbinical Hebrew calendar is the year 7082 in this calendar.

Holidays in the Haymanot  divided into daily, monthly and annually. The annual holiday by month are:

Nisan: ba'āl lisan (Nisan holiday – New Year) on 1, ṣomä fāsikā (Passover fast) on 14, fāsikā (Passover) between 15 – 21 and gadfat (grow fat) or buho (fermented dough) on 22.
Iyar: another fāsikā (Second Passover – Pesach Sheni) between 15 – 21.
Sivan: ṣomä mã'rar (Harvest fast) on 11 and mã'rar (Harvest – Shavuot) on 12.
Tammuz: ṣomä tomos (Tammuz fast) between 1 – 10.
Av: ṣomä ab (Av fast) between 1 – 17.
Seventh Sabbath: fixed as the fourth Sabbath of the fifth month.
Elul:  awd amet (Year rotate) on 1, ṣomä lul (Elul fast) between 1 – 9, anākel astar'i (our atonement) on 10 and asartu wasamantu (eighteenth) on 28.
Tishrei: ba'āl Matqe (blowing holiday – Zikhron Trua) on 1, astasreyo (Day of Atonement – Yom Kippur) on 10 and ba'āla maṣallat (Tabernacles holiday – Sukkot) between 15 – 21.
Cheshvan: holiday for the day Moses saw the face of God on 1, holiday for the reception of Moses by the Israelites on 10, fast on 12 and měhlělla (Supplication – Sigd) on 29.
Kislev: another ṣomä mã'rar and mã'rar on 11 and 12 respectively.
Tevet: ṣomä tibt (Tevet fast) between 1 – 10.
Shevat: wamashi brobu on 1.
Adar: ṣomä astēr (Fast of Esther – Ta'anit Ester) between 11 – 13.

Monthly holidays are mainly memorial days to the annual holiday, these are yačaraqā ba'āl ("new moon festival")  on the first day of every month, asärt ("ten") on the tenth day to commemorate Yom Kippur, 'asrã hulat ("twelve") on the twelfth day to commemorate Shavuot, asrã ammest ("fifteen") on the fifteenth day to commemorate Passover and Sukkot, and ṣomä mälěya a fast on the last day of every month. Daily holidays include the ṣomä säňňo (Monday fast), ṣomä amus (Thursday fast), ṣomä 'arb (Friday fast) and the very holy Sanbat (Sabbath).

Monasticism
The Beta Israel of Ethiopia were the only modern Jewish group with a monastic tradition where the monks lived separated from the Jewish villages in monasteries. This collective monastic tradition existed until the middle of the 20th century.

See also
 Karaite Judaism, a denomination of Judaism that bears similarities to Haymanot

Notes

References

 
Beta Israel
Ethiopian Jews
Jewish religious movements